Major general Ghazi Mohammed Daghistani was born in Baghdad in 1912, the youngest son of Field marshal Fazil Daghistani Pasha.

Family History 
It was only by accident that Ghazi Daghistani was Iraqi by birth. His father was a local from Dagestan Oblast and a nephew by marriage of the great Sheikh Shamil who raised parts of Dagestan Oblast and Chechnya against Imperial Russia in the days of the Crimean War. After his defeat by Prince Bariatinsky, Sheikh Shamil himself was taken off to Russia, but Mahomet Fazil Daghistani and others escaped over the frontier and joined up in the Turkish Army. Mahomet Fazil Daghistani, Ghazi's father, rose to high command and fought against the Russians in the Turkish/Russian war of 1877. Later he became one of die favourite generals of the Sultan Abdul Hamid II, but as with all favourite Generals of this particular Sultan this favour did not last for ever and he was suddenly exiled to Baghdad in 1880. He was put in command of die Irregular forces which were dealing with tribal affairs in Kurdistan and he is mentioned for his popularity and abilities in Mark Sykes' book The Caliph's Last Heritage. When the 1914 war broke out General Mahomet Fazil Daghistani took the field with his Irregulars against the advancing British forces and was eventually killed at the head of his troops before the capture of Baghdad.

After the war the family continued to live on in Baghdad. Ghazi's elder brother, Daoud Beg, was a well-known figure on the racecourse and had a large area of property in the neighbourhood of Baqubah where he entertained with princely hospitality; he was a very keen shot and falconer.

Early life 
Ghazi went to secondary school in Beirut and subsequently entered the Royal Iraqi Military College where he was in the same Company as his future sovereign, King Ghazi of Iraq. Later he was sent to Woolwich where he qualified at the Royal Military Academy in 1933, returning to the Royal Engineers in the Iraqi Army.

After a few years in various junior appointments he passed out from the Iraqi Staff College and was then sent to the Staff College at Quetta, where he qualified in 1939.

Military life 
He was subsequently employed in several important posts in the Ministry of Defence before being appointed Chief of Staff to the Allied Arab Commander in the short-lived Palestine Campaign in 1948. In 1954 he was posted as Military attaché to London where he remained until 1957. He was awarded an Honorary C.V.O. in 1953 for services with H.R.H. the Duke of Gloucester at the Coronation of H.M. King Faisal II of Iraq.

On his return to Baghdad after leaving London he was appointed Deputy Chief of the General Staff. His responsibilities in this post included much of the detailed negotiations in London and Washington connected with the Baghdad Pact and the subsequent military planning.

In the summer of 1958 he was posted to command the 3rd Division, but on the murder of the King and the fall of the monarchy he was tried, imprisoned and condemned to death. He was released in 1960 and lived quietly in London until his sudden death.

Death 
The following address was read at his funeral:

" To all here, the sudden death of this highly gifted and lovable soldier, Major-General Ghazi Mohammed Daghistani, comes with a sense of shock. Those of us who knew him twenty years ago, gay and young, with a fine brain and a tremendous interest in his profession, considered him to be the out- standing soldier of the younger generation of the Iraqi Army. He seemed bound for High Command and also bound to play a great part in the leading circles of the Government of his country. Everything seemed to fit him for it, his charm, his tolerance, his fine brain, his linguistic ability, his sense of pro- portion and above all his high standards of conduct. He was outstanding in any company and at any time—but then tragedy came. After his fall from power—and after two years of imprisonment under sentence of death—he returned to a life of exile in England and here he was an example to all who suffer adversity. He faced his new life with dignity, serenity and courage, never blaming others for his misfortunes and always hoping that one day he might still render some service to the land he loved. He was supported throughout by a very happy family life. To his much- loved wife and children we offer our sympathy today. They have lost a beloved husband and father and we too have lost a much loved friend."

External sources
http://www.tandfonline.com/doi/pdf/10.1080/03068376608731952

Iraqi generals